Ryan Village is an unincorporated community in Cass County, Minnesota, United States, within the Bowstring State Forest and the Chippewa National Forest. It is located between Cass Lake and Bena along U.S. Highway 2. The village is within the Leech Lake Indian Reservation.

References

Unincorporated communities in Cass County, Minnesota
Unincorporated communities in Minnesota